Lechința is a commune in Bistrița-Năsăud County, Transylvania, Romania. It is composed of seven villages: Bungard, Chiraleș, Lechința, Sângeorzu Nou, Sâniacob, Țigău, and Vermeș.

Geography
The commune is situated on the Transylvanian Plateau, in the Nösnerland, a historic region of northeastern Transylvania. It lies on the banks of the Lechința River.

It is crossed by county roads DJ151 and DJ172E.

History
The Battle of Kerlés occurred in Chiraleș village in 1068; an army of Pechenegs and Ouzes commanded by Osul was defeated by the troops of King Solomon of Hungary and his cousins, Dukes Géza and Ladislaus.

Demography
At the 2011 census, 72% of inhabitants were Romanians, 19.2% Roma, 8.4% Hungarians, and 0.2% Germans.

Notable residents
Ionuț Hlinca (born 1988), Romanian footballer
George Mantello (1901–1992), Jewish businessman who saved thousands of Jews from the Holocaust while working as a diplomat for El Salvador

Economy
The Lechința Solar Park is located in Lechința village. 

The Lechința wine region is one the northernmost such regions on the Transylvanian Plateau; it comprises wineries located in Lechința, Teaca, Bistrița, and Batoș.

References

Communes in Bistrița-Năsăud County
Localities in Transylvania